Cacotherapia poecilostigma is a species of snout moth in the genus Cacotherapia. It was described by Harrison Gray Dyar Jr. in 1914, and is known from Panama.

References

Cacotherapiini
Moths described in 1914